Nicolas Cornet (Amiens, 1572 – Paris, 1663) was a French Catholic theologian.

Life

He studied at the Jesuit college of Amiens, took the doctorate of theology at the University of Paris, 1626, and soon became president of the Collège de Navarre and syndic of the Sorbonne (faculty of theology). In this latter capacity he reported to the assembly of the Sorbonne, 1649, seven propositions, two taken from Antoine Arnauld's Fréquente Communion and five from the Augustinus of Jansenius. 

Junii 1649", and Arnauld in "Considérations sur l'entreprise faite par M. Cornet, syndic de la faculté, en l'assemblée de Juillet 1649", he succeeded in having the Assembly of the Clergy of 1650 denounce the five propositions of the Augustinus to Pope Innocent X, who condemned them, 31 May 1653. 

Maligned by Jansenist writers like Hermant, Cornet was held in high esteem by Richelieu and Mazarin. His eulogy was pronounced by Bossuet. He left no writings, but is said to have collaborated with Richelieu on the Méthodes de controverse.

Notes

References
Attribution
 cites:
Rapin, Mémoires (Paris, 1865); 
Sainte-Beuve, Port-Royal (Paris, 1871); 
Rohrbacher, Histoire universelle (Paris, 1885), XI, 9, 150.

1572 births
1663 deaths
University of Paris alumni
Academic staff of the University of Paris
17th-century French Catholic theologians